John Nichol Irwin II (December 31, 1913 – February 28, 2000) was an American diplomat and attorney during the Cold War. During World War II, he served in the Army in the Pacific as a member of General Douglas MacArthur's staff and reached the rank of lieutenant colonel.

Biography
He was born on December 31, 1913, in Keokuk, Iowa. After graduating from the Fordham University School of Law, he became an attorney, eventually working as a lawyer at Patterson, Belknap & Webb.

He was the last person to hold the position of Under Secretary of State when that was the U.S. State Department's second-ranking office (1970-1972). In 1972, he became the first person to hold the office of Deputy Secretary of State, which succeeded the office of Under Secretary; he held that office until February 1, 1973. 

In both capacities, his superior was Secretary William P. Rogers. Irwin resigned from the position of Deputy Secretary to serve as U.S. Ambassador to France.

He died on February 28, 2000, in New Haven, Connecticut, at the age of 86.

References 

United States Under Secretaries of State
United States Deputy Secretaries of State
Ambassadors of the United States to France
People from Keokuk, Iowa
1913 births
2000 deaths
Iowa Republicans
Connecticut Republicans
Nixon administration personnel
Lawrenceville School alumni
Princeton University alumni
Alumni of the University of Oxford
Fordham University alumni